The Hook Bill or Dutch Hookbill ( or ) is a breed of domestic duck characterised by an unusual down-curved beak. It is an ancient breed, and has been documented since the seventeenth century. Speculation that it originated in Asia, or is related to the Indian Runner, is apparently unsubstantiated.

History 

The origins of the Hook Bill are unknown. The earliest published illustration and description appear to be those in the Ornithologiæ Libri Tres of Francis Willughby, published in 1676. Willughby's book is in Latin; when it was re-published by John Ray in English in 1678, the description of the Hook-billed Duck was:

Around 100 years ago there were many, as duck eggs were more sold than chicken eggs, but now its worldwide population in captivity is estimated to be no more than 800 individual egg-laying females. It is now considered an endangered duck breed.

Some were taken to the United States in 2000; the breed is not among those listed in the Standard of Perfection of the American Poultry Association.

In 2007 the conservation status of the Hook Bill was listed by the FAO as "endangered" at European level. In 2020 it was reported to DAD-IS as "at risk", while the Dutch  classified it as "critical", as did the Livestock Conservancy in the United States. It was not on the rare breed watchlist of the Rare Breeds Survival Trust in the United Kingdom.

Characteristics 

The Hook Bill is a light duck, with an average weight of approximately  Three colour variants are recognised in France, the Netherlands and the United Kingdom: the dusky mallard has a black head and rump with green lustre, the body in shades of grey with no white neck-ring, and a slate-grey beak; the white-bibbed dusky mallard is similarly coloured, but with a distinct white chest-bib and white-tipped wing primaries; the white has pure white plumage, blue eyes, bright orange legs and a flesh-pink bill. A further seventeen colours are listed for Germany by the Entente Européenne, but are not accepted in the European standard.

Use 

The Hook Bill may be kept for ornament or for exhibition, but is also a good layer: ducks may give between 100 and 225 white or greenish-blue eggs per year.

References

Duck breeds originating in the Netherlands